Saints Abdon and Sennen, variously written in early calendars and martyrologies Abdo, Abdus, and Sennes, Sennis, Zennen, are recognized by the Catholic Church and Eastern Orthodox Church as Christian Martyrs, with a feast day on 30 July. In some places they have been honoured on 20 March, and the first Sunday of May.

Nothing is known historically about Abdon and Sennen, and whether they can be verified. The Roman Martyrology indicates that they were martyred for their faith, and suggests they were buried on 30 July in the Cemetery of Pontianus on the Via Portuensis, outside Rome. Their names were subsequently removed in the twentieth century from the list in the General Roman Calendar, which is commemorated liturgically worldwide, but they may still be celebrated everywhere on their feast day unless in some locality an obligatory celebration is assigned to that day. The rank of their celebration was given as "Simple" in the Tridentine Calendar and remained such until the classification was changed to that of "Commemoration" in the General Roman Calendar of 1960.

Veneration
Their Acts, written for the most part prior to the 9th century, describe them as Persian nobles, captured and taken to Rome during a military campaign in the third century. There they became slaves, converted to Christianity and helped bury the Christian dead. They came to the attention of Emperor Decius who had them taken in chains before the Roman Senate, where they refused to sacrifice to the Roman Gods, and so were dismembered by gladiators in the Colosseum  approximately in the year 250. The Acts certainly contain several fictitious statements about the cause, the circumstances of their coming to Rome and the nature of their torments. They relate that their bodies were buried by a subdeacon, "Quirinus", and later transferred in the reign of Constantine (306 - 337) to the Cemetery of Pontianus on the road to Porto, near the gates of Rome.

A fresco found on a sixth century sarcophagus supposed to contain their remains represents them receiving crowns from Christ. Several cities, notably Florence and Soissons, claim possession of their bodies, but the Acta Sanctorum insist that they rest in the Basilica of San Marco Evangelista al Campidoglio, Rome, having been brought there in 1474. They may have even had their own church in Rome, which has now been lost. The Benedictine Abbey of Sainte-Marie in Arles-sur-Tech, France also claims their tomb.

Abdon and Sennen are patron saints of Calasparra, in Murcia, Spain.  The feasts days celebrated in their honor in this Spanish town date back to the 16th century.

List of churches dedicated to these saints 

Germany
St. Abdon & Sennen Church, Salzgitter-Ringelheim, Lower Saxony
Spain
Hermitage of the stone saints, Cullera, Valencian Community.
Hermitage of the stone saints, Sueca, Valencia.

St. Sennen's Church in Sennen, Cornwall is in fact dedicated to St Sinninus (also known as St Senan), a sixth-century Irish bishop.

Further reading

References

External Links
Catholic Culture

3rd-century births
3rd-century deaths
Persian saints
4th-century Christian saints
4th-century Iranian people
Christians in the Sasanian Empire